Oudekapelle is a small village in the Belgian province of West Flanders and a part ("deelgemeente") of the municipality of Diksmuide. Oudekapelle is a small village with only about ten houses around the church and farms on its territory. It has about 150 inhabitants.

Oudekapelle was an independent municipality until 1971, when it became a part of a newly formed municipality of Driekapellen, together with Nieuwkapelle en Sint-Jacobskapelle. In 1977, Driekapellen itself became a part of Diksmuide.

Populated places in West Flanders
Sub-municipalities of Diksmuide